Regina Martyrum High School is a private aided co-educational school located within the Assolna village in salcete taluka of Goa. It is administered by the Diocesan Society of Education, Panjim. The school is associated with the Goa Board of Secondary & Higher Secondary Education and the Directorate of Education, Goa. It prepares students for Std. X (S.S.C) examination. The first batch of S.S.C had appeared in March 1974.

History

The school was founded in 1961 by late Fr. Jose Martinho Rodrigues de Silva (the former vicar & manager) in an old building next to Our Lady of Martyrs Church, Assolna. It is administered by the Diocesan Society of Education, Panjim, the society is a religious based minority institution registered under societies registration order on 29 August 1962 in the office of sub-registrar, Panjim under registration no. 107 and under the Societies Registration Act, 1860 under registration no. 466. It was later in 1989, the school shifted into a new school building with a community hall that was constructed by late Rev. Fr. Alvaro Renato Mendes.

Later a library, sports room, pre-primary, computer lab, science lab and primary classrooms were constructed and inaugurated at the presence of Rev. Fr. Jose Agnelo Francisco dos Miliagres de Melo (former parish priest & manager) in 2007. Subsequently, an office, headmaster's room, manager's room and staff room were reconstructed along with the buffet hall that was attached to the existing school complex by Rev Fr. Lucio Alexander Dias (former parish priest & manager) in 2013. To reduce the burden of studies on pre-primary students, a park was constructed with slides, seesaws etc. by Fr. Lucio Dias in 2015.

Key people

Managers

Headmasters/Headmistress

Sports

The school competes at inter-school, village clubs, taluka, state and national level football competitions. It was during the tenure of headmaster, Francisco Goes, the school has shown tremendous success on the field, under the guidance of Phys. ed. teacher, Angelo Silva. On 28 July 2016, Regina Martyrum High School defeated Auxilium High School by a 5–4 victory via a tiebreaker to qualify for the semi finals of the U-14 Suborto Mukerjee Cup (Salcete Zone) football tournament, at artificial turf, Fatorda.

On 21 January 2017, Regina Martyrum High School U-14 football team made history by defeating Green Rosary High School, Dona Paula by a 4–2 victory to be declared as the state champions for the first time.

On 6 January 2018, Regina Martyrum High School defeated St. Thomas High School, Cansaulim by a 2–1 victory to qualify in the quarter finals of the St. Joseph Vaz Soccer Cup which was organised by Mount Mary's High School, Chinchinim at Our Lady of Hope Church ground, Chinchinim.

On 26 January 2018, Regina Martyrum High School beat Rosary High School, Navelim by a  3–1 victory via the tie-breaker to win the 1st Teacher Dolorosa Memorial U-17 Girls football tournament which was organised by Chandor Club, held at Chandor ground.

On 5 July 2018, Regina Martyrum High School, Assolna knocked out St Mary's High School, Varca by a 2–1 victory to qualify in the next round of the U-17 Suborto Mukherjee Salcete Taluka football tournament organised by DSYA, at Astro Turf ground, Fatorda.

On 26 July 2018, Regina Martyrum High School, Assolna knocked out Fatima Convent High School, Margao by a 6–1 victory to move into the semi-finals of the U-17 Subroto Mukherjee Salcete Taluka girls football tournament which was organised by DSYA, at Pandit Jawaharlal Nehru Stadium, Fatorda. On 29 July 2018, Regina Martyrum High School defeated Rosary Higher Secondary School, Navelim by a  2–0 victory to win the U-17 girls Salcete taluka Subroto Mukherjee football tournament which was organised by DSYA at Pandit Jawaharlal Nehru Stadium.

On 25 June 2019, Regina Martyrum High School beat Our Lady of Rosary High School, Fatorda by a 5–4 victory via the tie-breaker to win the UCV Inter-School Cup organized by the Union of Chinchinim Villagers, at Church ground, Chinchinim.

On 25 July 2019, Regina Martyrum High School defeated Bethany Convent High School, Sao Jose de Areal by a  5–4 victory via the tie-breaker to move into the quarter-finals of the 2nd Ramnath D. Volvotkar memorial inter-school football tournament which was organised by “Insight” The Society for Sports, Culture, Youth Affairs & Charity of Gudi Paroda, at the Gudi–Paroda ground. On 20 August 2019, Regina Martyrum High School defeated Our Lady Mother of Poor High School, Tilamol to qualify in the semi-finals of the late Ramnath D. Volvotkar Memorial 2nd All Goa inter-school U-17 boys football tournament which was organised by “Insight” the Society for Sports, Culture, Youth Affairs & Charity, at Gudi-Paroda ground.

On 23 August 2019, Regina Martyrum High School were qualified to play the finals with Our Lady of Succour High School, Nagoa-Verna of the late Ramnath D. Volvotkar Memorial 2nd all Goa inter-school U-17 boys football tournament, which was organised by "Insight" the Society for Sports, Culture, Youth Affairs & Charity of Gudi at Paroda ground, the finals were held on 24 August 2019. In the first semi-finals of the tournament, Regina Martyrum High School beat Rosary High School, Navelim 4-3 via the tie-breaker.

On 7 January 2020, Regina Martyrum High School defeated Bethany Convent High School, Sao Jose de Areal by a 3–1 victory to move ahead in the quarter finals of the St. Joseph Vaz Soccer Cup which was organised by Mount Mary's Educational Complex, Chinchinim at Our Lady of Hope Church ground, Chinchinim.

On 16 July 2022, Regina Martyrum High School along with four other schools including Loyola High School qualified to move ahead in the U-14 Subroto Mukherjee inter-school salcete taluka football tournament which was organised by DSYA at village school ground, Dramapur. The school's qualification came after a 3–0 win against Our Lady of Rosary High School, Fatorda.

Cultural activities

On 1 July 2022, the school celebrated the São Jão festival. The festival began with a prayer service, followed by a skit titled, A Journey with John the Baptist.  Next a flower crown (Konkani: kopel) making contest was organised for the primary and secondary students. The pre-primary teachers along with the students organised a game showcasing local fruits for São Jão. Further, the Parent-Teacher Association executive members prepared and served traditional a Goan sweet (Konkani: attol) on a banana. Later a traditional sweet dish making contest was organised for the parents. The judges for the contest were Neeraj Aguiar, Alvaro Velose and Sanzilan Aguiar from the Nusi Maritime Academy, Assolna. The competition was participated by around 49 parents.

Waste management
The school has also showcased their initiative in waste management during the tenure of headmaster, Francisco Goes, by the participation of the school's Parent-teacher association (PTA), teachers and students. On 20 July 2016, the teachers and students of Regina Martyrum High School along with six other schools demonstrated their enterprise in waste management through powerpoint presentations in the presence of then Minister of Environment, Rajendra Arlekar. They highlighted new suggestions which could be implemented by the younger generation to solve the waste management issue.

On 7 April 2018, a waste management workshop was held at Regina Martyrum High School to highlight the issues of the rise in air pollution caused by the indiscriminate burning of plastic waste and increased contamination and depletion of natural water resources due to waste dumping. The workshop was jointly organised by the school's (PTA) and the Assolna village panchayat. It also included live demonstration of an organic waste converter (OWC) as well as solar cookers that were used to bake sweet potatoes.

The organisers deliberated upon various safe garbage disposal methods to be undertaken by the locals, they also requested support from the Government of Goa to avow plastic into fuel through the process of pyrolysis. The students of Regina Martyrum High School from Std. V to Std. VII were also given an audio-visual presentation on the proper method of disposing garbage.

On 10 January 2020, the teachers and students of Regina Martyrum High school were among the 15 schools including St. Xavier's High School that attended the first edition of Olive Ridley Festival Creative organised by SaxttiKids School, Carmona which was conceptualised and created to emphasize the philosophy of SaxttiKids, to be "environment-friendly". The festival concentrated on recycling materials like carton cardboards, used wrapping paper, CDs, waste cloth, pebbles, coconut shoots and ice-creams tubs to craft Christmas decorations. Various niche crafting modules were devised to bring in the festive vibe of Christmas as well as brush up children’s learning and creative skills.

Robotics
On 8 December 2015, Regina Martyrum High School were among the 11 schools in the state to be selected to have a robotics lab installed within their premises. The Science and Technology Department would be responsible in adding the robotics labs which will function on pilot basis. Under this scheme of promotion of information, technology and science, the schools will receive an annual fund of  towards infrastructure, training, projects and contests.

Faculty awards
On 17 February 2017, Francisco Goes along with six other teachers from other catholic schools were felicitated by Archbishop of Goa and Daman, Filipe Neri Ferrao for over 30 years of service at the All Goa Catholic Educational Institutions Day which was celebrated at Kala Academy.

On 30 October 2018, the Canon Antimo Gomes annual award for Diocesan Society of Education was presented to Angelo Silva, the physical education teacher of Regina Martyrum High School along with three other teachers from different schools.

Notable alumni
 Romeo Fernandes, Indian association football player

See also

 List of schools in Goa
 Education in Goa

Notes

References

External links

 Regina Ex Student's Association (RESA)
 Regina Martyrum High School on YouTube
 Regina Martyrum High School on Facebook

1962 establishments in Goa, Daman and Diu
Schools in Goa
Schools in India
Private schools in Goa
Education in South Goa district
High schools and secondary schools in Goa
Buildings and structures in Goa
Catholic schools in India